Tibo Van de Velde (born 5 December 1993) is a Belgian professional footballer who plays as a winger for Sint-Eloois-Winkel. He formerly played for Roeselare, Deinze and Cercle Brugge.

Club career
Van de Velde progressed through the Roeselare youth academy, after having joined them as a 15-year-old after coming over from Club Brugge. On 4 September 2010, he made his debut in the Belgian Second Division against Royal Antwerp at the age of sixteen. On 17 November 2011, he scored his first league goal away against Rupel Boom. In 2012, he moved to Gent. 

In January 2013, he signed with Deinze, where he would score nineteen goals in 71 league matches. 

In June 2015, he signed a two-year contract with Cercle Brugge. 

On 12 August 2016, he signed a contract with Dutch Eerste Divisie club FC Eindhoven, who had finished in fourth place the previous season.

On 25 February 2018, Van de Velde signed a two-year contract with Knokke, joining them from 1 July 2018.

In 2019, he joined Zwevezele. 

On 19 February 2021, Van de Velde signed with Sint-Eloois-Winkel Sport, joining the club from 1 July 2021. On 29 August, he made his debut in the fifth round of the Belgian Cup, where his club knocked out Mandel United after a penalty shootout following a 0–0 draw. His league debut also occurred against Mandel, on 12 September, as the clubs drew again, this time 1–1. Van de Velde managed to score his first goal for Sint-Eloois-Winkel on 31 October in a 1–1 draw against league leaders Liège.

International career
Van de Velde gained multiple caps for Belgium between under-15 and under-18 level.

Personal life
Next to playing football, Van de Velde works as a mail carrier.

References

External links

1993 births
Living people
People from Maldegem
Footballers from East Flanders
Belgian footballers
Belgian expatriate footballers
K.S.V. Roeselare players
K.M.S.K. Deinze players
Cercle Brugge K.S.V. players
FC Eindhoven players
Sint-Eloois-Winkel Sport players
Eerste Divisie players
Challenger Pro League players
Belgian Third Division players
Association football wingers
Belgian expatriate sportspeople in the Netherlands
Expatriate footballers in the Netherlands
Belgium youth international footballers